Robert J. Yock (born January 11, 1938) is a senior judge of the United States Court of Federal Claims.

Early life, education, and career 
Born in St. James, Minnesota to Dr. William J. and Erma (Fritz) Yock, Yock attended St. Olaf College, graduating with a Bachelor of Arts in 1959. He received a Juris Doctor in 1962 from the University of Michigan Law School. He then served in the United States Navy from 1962 to 1966, in the Judge Advocate General's Corps.

Yock entered private practice in 1966, in St. Paul, Minnesota. In 1969 he joined the General Services Administration as Chief Counsel of the National Archives and Record Service, becoming Executive Assistant and Legal Advisor to the Administrator in 1970 and Assistant General Counsel from 1972 to 1977.

Federal judicial service 
In 1977, Yock became a trial judge for the United States Court of Claims. On October 1, 1982, became a judge of the United States Court of Federal Claims by operation of law, following passage of the Federal Courts Improvement Act of 1982. On June 20, 1983, Yock was nominated by President Ronald Reagan to a full fifteen year term on the court. He was confirmed by the United States Senate on August 4, 1983, and received his commission on August 5, 1983. Federal Trade Commissioner Maureen Ohlhausen was one of Yock's law clerks from 1991 to 1992. Yock transitioned to senior status on August 5, 1998, and is currently inactive.

Personal life
Yock married Carla M. Moen on June 13, 1964, with whom he has two children, Signe Kara and Torunn Ingrid.

References

External links 

Official Bio, U.S. Court of Federal Claims

Living people
1938 births
Judges of the United States Court of Federal Claims
United States Article I federal judges appointed by Ronald Reagan
20th-century American judges
University of Michigan Law School alumni
St. Olaf College alumni
People from St. James, Minnesota